Walia is a surname of Indian origin. People with this surname include:

Authors
 Harsha Walia, South Asian activist and author of Indian origin

Politicians
Ashok Kumar Walia, politician 
Kiran Walia, politician (a former minister)

Entertainment  
Bunty Walia, film producer
Niki Aneja Walia, television actress
Sonu Walia, Bollywood actress
Roshni Walia, Bollywood and television actress
Gunjan Walia, television actress
Khushwant Walia, television actor
Jasmin Walia, British-Indian singer

Sports
Ravi Walia, Canadian figure skater

Other countries
Harmeet D. Walia, American endodontist

Indian surnames
Surnames of Indian origin
Punjabi-language surnames
Hindu surnames